Daisies of the Galaxy is the third studio album by American rock band Eels. It was released on February 28, 2000, in the United Kingdom and March 14 in the United States by record label DreamWorks.

Production 
When the band's label requested that a clean version of "It's a Motherfucker" be recorded, the song was re-written as "It's a Monster Trucker", with modified lyrics and sound clips of lead singer Mark Oliver "E" Everett speaking "trucker lingo" on a CB radio.

Release 
Daisies of the Galaxy reached number eight in the UK Albums Chart. The single "Mr. E's Beautiful Blues" peaked at number 11 in the UK Singles Chart; the second single to be released from the album, "Flyswatter", charted at number 55.

Reception 

Daisies of the Galaxy received a generally favorable response from critics.

Fred Kovey of PopMatters called it "a fine pop record in an era that seems uninterested in pop unless it’s marketed with dance steps and a quicky bio. Though not the equal of the best work of Stephen Merritt  or Elliot Smith , Daisies of the Galaxy is worthy of attention by alterna-pop fans and anyone else desperate for catchy music for grown-ups." Stephen Thomas Erlewine of AllMusic wrote: "Unlike its predecessor, the album doesn't play like [E's] private diary; instead, it feels as if one is rummaging through his sketchbook. And, like many sketchbooks, some moments have blossomed, and others remain just intriguing, unformed ideas. For the dedicated, it's worth sifting through the album to find the keepers, since there are enough moments of quirky genius. But not all longtime fans will find this rewarding, since [E] has spent more time in creating mood than crafting songs. There are very few melodies that resonate like his best work, and the stripped-down, yet eccentric production – sounding much like a cross between Jon Brion and Beck – never feels realized."

In a retrospective review for Stylus Magazine, Ben Woolhead described Daisies of the Galaxy as "a very special collection of songs indeed".

Track listing 

Japanese bonus track

Personnel 

Eels

 Butch – drums, backing vocals
 E – vocals, guitar, electric bass, Wurlitzer organ, production, sleeve art direction, mixing

Additional musicians

 David Alvarez – drums
 Peter Buck – guitar
 Wayne Bergeron – horn
 Chris Bleth – horn
 Andy Martin – horn
 Grant-Lee Phillips – guitar
 Paul Edge - turntables

Technical

 Wally Gagel – engineering, mixing
 Jim Lang – engineering, horn and string arrangements, mixing
 Bob Ludwig – mastering
 Mickey Petralia – programming, engineering
 Francesca Restrepo – sleeve design and art direction
 Jeffrey Shannon – engineering
 Michael Simpson – production, engineering, mixing
 James Stone – engineering
 Adrian Tomine – sleeve illustrations

Charts

Certifications

References

External links 
 

2000 albums
DreamWorks Records albums
Eels (band) albums
Albums produced by Mark Oliver Everett